The Old La Grange Schoolhouse in La Grange, California is a Vernacular Greek Revival architecture building built in 1875 and modified in c. 1900, when its tower and porch were added.  It was LaGrange's first school.  "Both the 1875 Greek Revival and the ca.1900 picturesque details present on the building's exterior are indicative of major stylistic trends in California at these periods."

It was listed on the National Register of Historic Places in 1979.

References

History of Stanislaus County, California
School buildings on the National Register of Historic Places in California
School buildings completed in 1875
Greek Revival architecture in California
Buildings and structures in Stanislaus County, California
National Register of Historic Places in Stanislaus County, California